Lake Frances may refer to:

United States
Lake Frances (Glacier County, Montana), a lake in Glacier County, Montana
Lake Frances (Pondera County, Montana), a lake in Pondera County, Montana
Lake Frances (Wayne County, Michigan), a manmade lake in Palmer Park in Detroit, Michigan

See also
Frances Lake, a lake in Yukon, Canada
Lake Francis (disambiguation)
Francis Lake (disambiguation)